This List of Bays of Inner Hebrides summarises the bays that are located on the islands of the Inner Hebrides in Scotland.

Crowlin Islands

Eilean Mòr
The island of Eilean Mòr has the following bays:

Firth of Lorn

Eilean Dubh Mòr
The island of Eilean Dubh Mòr has the following bays:

Kerrera 
The island of Kerrera has the following bays:

Lismore 
The island of Lismore has the following bays:

Garvellachs

Eileach an Naoimh
This small island of Eileach an Naoimh has no bays.

Garbh Eileach
The island of Garbh Eileach has the following bays:

Islay

Colonsay

Danna 
A tidal island with no bays.

Gigha 
The island of Gigha has the following bays:

Cara Island

Islay

Jura

Oronsay

Scarba

Texa

Knapdale

Eilean dà Mhèinn 
A small inhabited island in Loch Crinan with no bays.

Loch Craignish

Eilean Mhic Chrion

Eilean Rìgh
The small island of Eilean Rìgh has no bays.

Eilean Trodday
The small island of Eilean Trodday has no bays.

Loch Linnhe

Eriska  
Erisa is a flat tidal island at the entrance to Loch Creran with no bays.

Loch Moidart

Eilean Shona

Eilean Tioram 
A small tidal island on the south channel of Loch Moidart with no bays.

Loch Sunnart

Càrna
There is no bays on Càrna.

Oldany
There is no bays on Oldany.

Oronsay
There is no bays on Oronsay.

Mull

Calve Island
This island has no bays.

Coll

Eorsa
The island of Eorsa has no bays.

Erraid

Gometra

Gunna

Inch Kenneth

Iona

Little Colonsay
This small island has no bays.

Mull

Staffa
The small island of Staffa has no bays.

Shuna
This island of Shuna has no bays.

Tiree

Ulva

Treshnish Isles

Lunga
This small island of Lunga has no bays.

North Highland

Eilean an Ròin Mòr
The small island of Eilean an Ròin Mòr and the much smaller island next to it, Eilean an Ròin Beag has no bays.

Eilean Horrisdale

Gruinard
This island has no bays.

Handa
This island has no bays.

Isle of Ewe

Longa Island

Sound of Arisaig

Eilean an Ròin Mòr
The small island of Eilean an Ròin Mòr has no bays.

Eilean Ighe
The small island of Eilean Ighe has no bays.

Skye

Eilean Bàn 
The small island of Eilean Bàn between Kyle of Lochalsh and the Isle of Skye and has no bays.

Eilean Orasaigh
The small island of Eilean Orasaigh has no bays.

Eilean Tigh
The small island of Eilean Tigh has no bays.

Harlosh
The small island of Harlosh has no bays.

Isay
The small island of Isay in Loch Dunvegan has no bays.

Longay
The small island of Longay has no bays.

Ornsay
The small island of Ornsay of the south-east coast of Skye has no bays.

Pabay
The small island of Pabay, off the southeast coast of Skye has no bays.

Raasay

Rona

Scalpay, Inner Hebrides

Skye

Soay, Inner Hebrides

Wiay

Cowlin Islands

Eilean Meadhanach

Slate Islands

Easdale

Insh
The small island of Insh has no bays.

Luing

Lunga

Seil 
The island of Seil has the following bays:

Shuna 
The island of Shuna has the following bays:

Torsa
A small island of Torsa off the north coast of Luing has no bays.

Small Isles

Canna 
The island of Canna has the following bays:

Eigg 
The island of Eigg has the following bays:

Muck 
The island of Muck has the following bays:

Rùm 
The island of Rùm has the following bays:

Sanday 
The island of Sanday has the following bays:

Summer Isles

Horse Island
The island of Horse has the following bays:

Island Macaskin
This small island of Island Macaskin has no bays.

Isle Martin
The island of Isle Martin has the following bays:

Isle Ristol

Priest Island

Tanera Beag

Tanera Mòr

See also
 List of bays of Scotland
 List of bays of the Outer Hebrides
 List of bays of the Shetland Islands
 List of bays of the Orkney Islands

References

Bays of Scotland
Lists of landforms of Scotland
Inner Hebrides